Statistics of Swiss Super League in the 1926–27 season.

East

Table

Results

Central

Table

Results

West

Table

Results

Final

Table

Results 

|colspan="3" style="background-color:#D0D0D0" align=center|8 May 1927

|-
|colspan="3" style="background-color:#D0D0D0" align=center|15 May 1927

|-
|colspan="3" style="background-color:#D0D0D0" align=center|22 May 1927

Grasshopper Club Zürich won the championship.

Sources 
 Switzerland 1926-27 at RSSSF

Swiss Serie A seasons
Swiss 
1926–27 in Swiss football